Sambalpur railway station serves Sambalpur district in the Indian state of Odisha. It is a major railway junction in Odisha and headquarters of Sambalpur railway division. This railway station is the cleanest railway station of East Coast Railway declared by Indian Railway. There are four other railway stations serving Sambalpur, viz. Sambalpur Road railway station (SBPD), Sambalpur City railway station (SBPY), Hirakud (HKG), across the Mahanadi and Maneswar railway station (MANE). Locally this station is called Khetrajpur railway station since it is located in that area of the city. Sambalpur Junction is the oldest and one of the biggest and busiest railway stations of Odisha and East Coast Railway Division.

History
The  Sambalpur - Titilagarh  Railway  line  forms  a  part  at  the  Project  to  develop  capacity  for  the  ex­port  of  two  million  tons of ore    annually  through  the  Visakhapatnam Port.  The  Project is  the  result at  a tripartite  agreement  between  the  U.SA.,  Japan  and  our  country.  The Government of U.S.A. have agreed to

According to the present estimates construction of the railway line which is going to be 114 tows in length sanctioned on 24th April 1959  would  cost  Rs.  14.58
crores.  That  would  be the construc­tion part of it We would require some more money for import of diesel loco­motives  and  all  that  For  that  we hope  the  United  States  loan  will  be available.  The Sambalpur–Titilagarh line was opened to traffic in 1963. The Sambalpur- Titlagarh line was opened to traffic in April 1963. The Sambalpur–Talcher line was sanctioned in 1983 and was completed in 1998.

Railway Organization
Sambalpur Railway station is functioning under Sambalpur Division of East Coast Railway.

Doubling
Doubling of Sambalpur–Jharsuguda railway line is completed, and Sambalpur–Titlagarh has been sanctioned and work is in progress.

Electrification
Electrification of the Titlagarh–Sambalpur–Jharsuguda and Angul-Sambalpur sections were sanctioned in the Railway Budget for 2012–13. Electrified double tracks are now operational between Titlagarh–Sambalpur – Jharsuguda stations. Work of doubling and electrification between Sambalpur and Angul is in progress. In September 2015, the route has been electrified from Angul to Kerejanga and the work is expected to be completed in the upcoming 5 years.

Amenities
Sambalpur railway station has a four-bedded dormitory. Other amenities at the railway station include computerized reservation offices, telephone booth, cloak room, waiting room and book stall.

Passenger movement
11 train originate at Sambalpur and 56 trains (including weeklies and bi-weeklies) pass through this station.

Sambalpur railway station serves around 140,000 passengers every day.

Expansion and requirement of new trains
With current infrastructure attaining full utilization, there is requirement of additional 2 platforms to accommodate more space for the station, with this the station shall have 7 platforms, along with platforms 1A and 2A.
There is also a need to start commuter train service between Sambalpur and Angul Section and Sambalpur- Jharsuguda- Rourkela Section of East Coast Railway and South Eastern Railway respectively.

References

External links
   Trains at Sambalpur

Railway stations in Sambalpur district
Railway junction stations in Odisha
Transport in Sambalpur
Sambalpur railway division
Railway stations opened in 1963
Buildings and structures in Sambalpur